Gardena is a genus of thread-legged bugs in the subfamily Emesinae. It is the second-largest genus in the tribe Emesinii. Presently there are 46 described species.

Partial species list
These 10 species belong to the genus Gardena:
 Gardena albiannulata Ishikawa, 2005 g
 Gardena brevicollis Stål, 1871 g
 Gardena cheesmanae Wygodzinsky, 1958
 Gardena elkinsi Wygodzinsky, 1966 i c g b
 Gardena faustina McAtee & Malloch, 1925 g
 Gardena insignis Horvath, 1887 g
 Gardena insperata P. V. Putshkov, 1988
 Gardena melinarthrum Dohrn, 1860 i c g
 Gardena muscicapa (Bergroth, 1906) g
 Gardena poppaea McAtee and Malloch, 1925 i c g
Data sources: i = ITIS, c = Catalogue of Life, g = GBIF, b = Bugguide.net

References

Reduviidae
Cimicomorpha genera